is a Japanese actor and voice actor affiliated with Office Osawa. He is originally from Nagasaki Prefecture.

Live appearances
Goodbye Boy
Matasaburo-kun no Koto: Bokura no Jidai
Beautiful Mystery

Voice roles

Video games
Valkyrie Profile (Grey, Gabriel Celesta)

Dubbing
Fraggle Rock (Uncle Travelling Matt, Pa Gorg)
"The Lion King" (Young version of Simba)

External links
 Tatsuya Nagatomo at Les Voix des Anges

1953 births
Living people
Male voice actors from Nagasaki Prefecture
Japanese male voice actors